Christopher Montane Smith (born June 1, 1963) is a former American football running back who played two seasons with the Kansas City Chiefs of the National Football League. He played college football at the University of Notre Dame and attended La Salle High School in Cincinnati, Ohio.

References

External links
Just Sports Stats
College stats

Living people
1963 births
Players of American football from Cincinnati
American football running backs
Notre Dame Fighting Irish football players
Kansas City Chiefs players
National Football League replacement players